Rahmon Ade bello (born October 1948) is a Nigerian professor of Chemical Engineering, educational administrator and former vice chancellor of the University of Lagos, Nigeria.

Early life and education
Rahmon was born in October 1948 in Ogun State, southwestern Nigeria. He was educated at Egbado College in Ilaro, a town in Ogun State. He proceeded to the Polytechnic of Ibadan, where he received an OND in mechanical engineering. In 1974, he obtained a Bachelor of Science (B.Sc.) degree in chemical engineering from the Obafemi Awolowo University. He holds a master's degree in chemical engineering from the University of Waterloo and doctorate degree (Ph.D.) from the same university

Career
He was appointed as the acting vice chancellor of the University of Lagos in May 2012 following the sudden death of the then incumbent vice chancellor, professor Babatunde Adetokunbo Sofoluwe, who died of heart attack in 2012. In November 2012, Rahmon was confirmed as the vice chancellor of the university, a position he held till November 2017.

He is a fellow of several professional bodies like the Nigerian Academy of Engineering, Nigerian Society of Engineers, Nigerian Society of Chemical Engineers and a COREN registered engineer.

References

See also
Babatunde Adetokunbo Sofoluwe
List of vice chancellors in Nigeria
University of Lagos

Nigerian educational theorists
1948 births
Yoruba academics
People from Ogun State
Obafemi Awolowo University alumni
University of Waterloo alumni
Academic staff of the University of Lagos
Living people
Nigerian engineers
The Polytechnic, Ibadan alumni
Vice-Chancellors of the University of Lagos